Michelle Hodge (born 18 January 1975) is a former association football goalkeeper who represented New Zealand at international level.

Hodge made her Football Ferns début in a 1–4 loss to Germany on 26 May 1998, and finished her international career with three caps to her credit.

References

1975 births
Living people
New Zealand women's association footballers
New Zealand women's international footballers
Women's association football goalkeepers